Def Comedy Jam is an HBO television series produced by Russell Simmons.

The series had its original run from March 7, 1992 to May 2, 1997. Simmons was inspired to make Def Comedy Jam by The Uptown Comedy Club in Harlem, New York and Jerry Lewis' movie The Nutty Professor. The show returned on HBO's fall lineup in 2006. Def Comedy Jam helped to launch the careers of several African-American stand-up comedians. Comedian Rich Vos was the first Caucasian to perform on the show.

Spin-offs
The show produced a spinoff called Loco Slam.

Home media
The show was released on DVD boxsets in the US and the UK.

References

External links
HBO - Def Comedy Jam
Def Comedy Jam 25 on Netflix
 

HBO original programming
1992 American television series debuts
1997 American television series endings
1990s American stand-up comedy television series
2000s American stand-up comedy television series
2006 American television series debuts
2008 American television series endings
American television series revived after cancellation
English-language television shows
Def Jam Recordings